Fried Liver or fried liver may refer to:

Fried Liver Attack, a chess opening
Chaogan, a kind of Chinese cuisine.
Liver (food)